São Sebastião (Portuguese for Saint Sebastian) is a parish in the municipality of Ponta Delgada in the Azores. The population in 2011 was 3,953, in an area of 3.34 km². The parish is part of the downtown area of Ponta Delgada. Until June 30, 2003, the parish was known as Matriz (Ponta Delgada).

Economy

SATA International/SATA Air Açores has its head office in the parish.

Architecture

Civic
 City Gates
 Caixa Geral de Depósitos (CGD) Building
 Comando da Defesa Marítima of Ponta Delgada Building
 Correios, Telégrafos e Telefones (CTT) Building
 Estate of Solar do Condes de Albuquerque
 Estate of Solar José do Canto (also known as Solar Scholtze or Solar Bérquos)
 Estate of Solar São Joaquim
 House on Rua do Melo No.62
 House on Rua Dr. Guilherme Poças, No.14
 House on Rua Dr. Luís Bettencourt, No.24-28
 House on Rua Margarida Chaves, No.28
 House in Largo Marquês de Pombal
 Hospital of Ponta Delgada
 Jardim de Francisco Bettencourt
 Municipal Palace/Hall of Ponta Delgada, the 17th century municipal hall/seat of government for the municipality; a three-story building situated in the central square, making the de facto regional capital of São Miguel, following the destruction of Vila Franca do Campo in 1522. 
 Palace of Santana, also known as the Palace of Jácome Correia - the official residence of the President of the Regional Government of the Azores

Religious
 Chapel of Sant' Ana
 Church of the Jesuit College, located in the Largo do Marques de Pombal, half a kilometre north of the historic centre, the Church was part of a group of buildings constructed by the Campanhia do Jesus (the Jesuits) to provide ecclesiastical education to the residents of Ponta Delgada. The church, officially the Church of Todos-os-Santos (All Saints) was constructed through the initiatives of João Lopes, who convinced the Jesuit priests and Diocese of Angra to establish their school. The church is characterized by a grande façade of imposing doors, circular windows and verandas, topped by an incomplete double clock-tower. It is one of the peripheral buildings of the Carlos Machado Museum (sacred arts wing), the home of the Library and Archive of Ponta Delgada, and its convent annexes occupied by offices of the regional government.
 Church of São Sebastião
 Church of Santa Bárbara
 Convent of Santo André* Chapel of São Bráz

References

Parishes of Ponta Delgada